Gijuiyeh (also Romanized as Gījū‘īyeh; also known as Gījū Galūyeh) is a village in Fathabad Rural District, in the Central District of Baft County, Kerman Province, Iran. At the 2006 census, its population was 14, in 7 families.

References 

Populated places in Baft County